PHD finger protein 1 is a protein that in humans is encoded by the PHF1 gene.

Function 

This gene encodes a protein with significant sequence similarity to Drosophila Polycomblike. The encoded protein contains a zinc finger-like PHD (plant homeodomain) finger which is distinct from other classes of zinc finger motifs and which shows the typical Cys4-His-Cys3 arrangement. PHD finger genes are thought to belong to a diverse group of transcriptional regulators possibly affecting eukaryotic gene expression by influencing chromatin structure. Two transcript variants have been found for this gene.

References

Further reading

External links 
 

Transcription factors